George Dominic Murray (July 6, 1889 – June 18, 1956) was an admiral in the United States Navy and an early naval aviator.

Biography
Murray was born in Boston, Massachusetts, attended the U.S. Naval Academy, graduating in 1911 and becoming naval aviator number 22 in 1915.

At the beginning of 1924, he was the commander of Torpedo and Bombing Squadron 20 (VT-20). In January, his squadron of seaplanes was transferred from San Diego to the Philippines aboard  to provide air support for the Asiatic Fleet.

During World War II, Murray commanded the aircraft carrier , from 21 March 1941 to 30 June 1942, which included the Doolittle Raid on Tokyo and the Battle of Midway.

From 17 August 1944 to 20 July 1945, he commanded U.S. Naval Air Forces, Pacific Fleet.

At the end of the war, Murray was the commander of the Mariana Islands, and accepted the Japanese surrender of the Caroline Islands aboard his flagship, the cruiser .

He commanded the First Fleet from August 1947 to August 1948. 

He retired as a full admiral in 1951, died in San Francisco, California, on 18 June 1956, and was buried in Arlington National Cemetery.

In 1961, Murray was posthumously designated the third recipient of the Gray Eagle Award, as the most senior active naval aviator from 1947 until his retirement.

Personal life
Murray is the stepfather of Vice Admiral Lloyd M. Mustin, the step grandfather of Vice Admiral Henry C. Mustin, and the step great grandfather of Vice Admiral John B. Mustin.

References

External links
 The Pacific War Online Encyclopedia: Murray, George D.

1889 births
1956 deaths
United States Naval Academy alumni
United States Naval Aviators
United States Navy admirals
United States Navy World War II admirals
United States Navy personnel of World War I
Members of the Early Birds of Aviation
Recipients of the Navy Cross (United States)
Recipients of the Navy Distinguished Service Medal
Recipients of the Legion of Merit
Burials at Arlington National Cemetery